Wootton Bassett railway station may refer to:

Wootton Bassett Road railway station, temporary railway station in England opened from 1840 to 1841
Wootton Bassett Junction railway station, railway station in England opened from 1841 to 1965